La Pocatière is a town in the Kamouraska Regional County Municipality in the Bas-Saint-Laurent region of Quebec, Canada.

Demographics 

Economy

Alstom has a  plant which manufactures subway and railway cars:

 R62A (New York City Subway car)
 Montreal Metro MR-73 and MPM-10
 Boston Red Line (MBTA) 1800-85 series cars
 MultiLevel Coach cars
 VIA Rail LRC (train) set
 shell for Toronto Transit Commission subway cars (T1 and TR) and streetcars (Flexity Outlook)

The plant was built in 1961 to build Moto-Ski snowmobiles and the plant was converted to railcars in 1971 (Bombardier continued to market Moto-Ski until 1985).

Culture and attractions
La Pocatière is home to the Musée François-Pilote, a museum of Quebec ethnology.  The museum features exhibits on the history of agricultural education, a number of historical period rooms, stuffed bird and animal displays, and presentations on other aspects of local history.

Near the city are small isolated hills known as monadnocks. The Montagne du College-de-Sainte-Anne-de-la-Pocatière is 119 metres high.

City council

City council consists of a mayor and 6 councillors:

As of 2017 the council consists of:

 Mayor: Sylvain Hudon
 Councillors: 
 1: Lise Bellefeuille
 2: Claude Brochu
 3: Steve Leclerc
 4: Pierre Darveau
 5: Lise Garneau, 
 6: Louise Lacoursière

Education

There are three post-secondary institutions in La Pocatière:
 Collège de Sainte-Anne-de-la-Pocatière - c. 1827
 Cégep de La Pocatière c. 1967
 Institut de technologie agroalimentaire - agro-food technology institute with focus on equines (horses) at the La Pocatière campus

The town has three public schools under the Commission scolaire de Kamouraska—Rivière-du-Loup: 
 École Sacré-Coeur - elementary school
 École Polyvalente La Pocatière - secondary school
 Éducation des adultes - adult learning

Twin towns
La Pocatière is twinned with:

  Coutances in France

See also
 List of municipalities in Quebec

References

External links

City web site
La Pocatière en images...

 
Cities and towns in Quebec
Canada geography articles needing translation from French Wikipedia